Ua Máel Fogmair III was Bishop of Killala from 1179.

References

12th-century Roman Catholic bishops in Ireland
Bishops of Killala